Utah State Route 139 (SR-139) is a  state highway in the state of Utah that connects U.S. Route 6 (US-6) to SR-157 in Carbon County.

Route description
The route begins at US-6 south of Helper in Spring Glen as Spring Glen Road.

History
In 1969, SR-139 was extended east past US-6 and north through Spring Glen to meet State Route 157, eight years after SR-157 had been extended north from Spring Glen to Helper. In 1978, SR-139 was lengthened by  when reconstruction of US-6 in the area necessitated moving its intersection with SR-139 southward, resulting in the current alignment.

Major intersections

References

139
 139
Streets in Utah